Jefferson Lewis House is a historic home located at Kenton, Kent County, Delaware.  The house was built about 1800, and is a two-story, three bay, center hall plan stuccoed brick dwelling with a gable roof.  Attached is a rear frame wing.  The front facade features a porch, added in the late-19th century.  Also on the property are three two-story barns, and a mix of late-19th and early-20th-century milk houses, corn cribs, machine sheds and chicken houses.

It was listed on the National Register of Historic Places in 1983.

References

Houses on the National Register of Historic Places in Delaware
Houses completed in 1800
Houses in Kent County, Delaware
Kenton, Delaware
National Register of Historic Places in Kent County, Delaware